The Twin Bridges Historic District, in Washington County, Arkansas, near Morrow, is an area surrounding two closed-spandrel, concrete-deck bridges completed in 1922 by the Luten Bridge Company. These bridges are located on County Route 3412 and former County Route 11. The district was added to the National Register of Historic Places on March 7, 1994.

Style
The two bridges are both single-span, closed spandrel concrete deck bridges. Formerly both on the winding County Route 11, the route was straightened in 1955 and has now bypassed these bridges on a new concrete facility.

Construction
By order of the county judge, local residents were to construct the approaches of the bridges by themselves to spare expense to the county. The Luten Bridge Company of Knoxville, Tennessee, was contracted for the work and for eleven other bridges in the county.

See also
List of bridges documented by the Historic American Engineering Record in Arkansas

References

External links

Road bridges on the National Register of Historic Places in Arkansas
Bridges completed in 1922
Luten bridges
Historic American Engineering Record in Arkansas
Historic districts on the National Register of Historic Places in Arkansas
National Register of Historic Places in Washington County, Arkansas
Concrete bridges in the United States
Arch bridges in the United States
Transportation in Washington County, Arkansas